Pont y Fenni Quarry and Road Cutting is an area that displays a wide array of fossils that is a Site of Special Scientific Interest in Carmarthen & Dinefwr,  Wales.

See also
List of Sites of Special Scientific Interest in Carmarthen & Dinefwr

References

Sites of Special Scientific Interest in Carmarthen & Dinefwr
Quarries in Wales